Pinoy Big Brother: Unlimited is the fourth main season of the Philippine ABS-CBN reality television series Pinoy Big Brother and the ninth season overall that aired from October 29, 2011. Toni Gonzaga and Bianca Gonzalez reprised their hosting stints for the show, together with PBB Teen Edition Plus ex-housemate Robi Domingo. The season ended on March 31, 2012, after 155 days, breaking Double Up's record for the longest duration by three more weeks and also ranked as one of the show's longest seasons worldwide, only surpassed by a number of seasons held in Germany. It is the first regular season with a male winner: Slater Young.

Auditions for the season started in Metro Manila on March 4, 2011, at the SM Mall of Asia where around 10,000 people attended. Show director Lauren Dyogi said the turnout at the Mall of Asia audition was the largest in the show's history. Other auditions were held at several key cities in the Philippines from March to July 2011, plus overseas auditions in Tokyo and Los Angeles. The total number of aspirants for the season, as claimed by the show, was 30,789. A total of 37 housemates entered for this season; fourteen on opening night, fifteen on Day 8, six on Day 15, and two on Days 23 and 25.
 
In the run-up to the premiere, a special weekday afternoon primer entitled Pinoy Big Brother: The Audition Stories started airing on October 24, 2011. It featured several participants whose audition stories caught the interest of the producers. The afternoon primer lasted until November 4, 2011. It eventually gave way to the new show, Pinoy Big Brother: UnliDay, the day main program. The said program shows the latest happenings of the Day Housemates from the Industrial House.

Overview

House theme
For the season, the exterior of the House was slightly tweaked to have slotted walls and minor modifications, but still keeping the yellow and blue color scheme. There are five areas for this season: four Houses and a special area. Two of the houses, the Industrial and Luxury Houses, are connected via a secret hallway first revealed on Day 22 and fully opened on Day 65.
Slums: First occupied on opening night, the Slums was made to look like a typical squatters' area in many urban areas in the Philippines. This was done to let the housemates experience the same living conditions as 15 million Filipinos who live in such areas, based from a typical answer during auditions of experiencing typical Filipino life. This House was demolished on Day 22.
Industrial House: The interior of the second House follows the regular House layout and its accompanying amenities. It is further given an "industrial" feel with steel, wooden, and brick walls. Unlike previous seasons, however, this House has no yard area. The house was opened on Day 8 and was closed down on Day 77.
Luxury House: Also called the Mansion, the third House is exquisitely furnished and brightly lit. Like the Industrial House, this House also has no yard area, although sunlight somehow passes through a curtain. This house was opened on Day 22.
Resort: Located adjacent to the Luxury House, this area is sophisticated with the inclusion of the pool and a Jacuzzi in the beach-themed Garden area. It is used as a venue for special occasions and tasks. This area was opened on Day 15 and the door to the resort (hidden under a curtain in the Luxury House) was opened on Day 65.
Hacienda: Located at the activity area, the Hacienda is modelled after a typical plantation in the Philippines by featuring several plants. It contains a large hut where the housemates would live in. This House was opened on Day 128.

Unlimited twists
 Reserved housemates — short-listed auditionees are given another chance to become official housemates.
 Unli-Day/Unli-Night —The show features two houses, each containing a different set of housemates. To accommodate both, a second main program, Unli-Day, was aired in the afternoons to focus on the events in the Industrial House. The setup only applies to weekdays; on weekends, nomination and eviction nights, and special shows, the primetime program would cover both Houses. With the closure of the Industrial House on Week 11, Unli-Day was directed towards covering events in the active House(s) while the host has an interview session with former housemates.
 House Swaps — Housemates will be made to swap houses and group members as instructed by Big Brother.
 SE Voting System — The public votes to save or evict a housemate. The housemate with the lowest net votes, Save and Evict votes combined, is evicted. This voting system was stopped after the fourth eviction round.
 Head of Household — Housemates compete against each other to be granted immunity in the coming nomination.
 House Competitions — For ten weeks, the two Houses compete in weekly major competitions with PHP150,000 at stake in each. At the end of those ten weeks, the cash accumulated by each team would be shared among the final five housemates in each House. The teams would also compete in "mini-battles" wherein the winning team would be given minor rewards.
 Intensity 7 — On Day 71, the remaining 20 housemates, 11 from Team High-Voltage and nine from Team Wayuk, were put-up for 24-hour public voting. The top five housemates from each team will be safe from elimination on Day 78, where six housemates will be evicted from the house. A sequel twist, called the Aftershock, would test the remaining housemates further.
 Various Nominations – Various nomination processes were implemented as per Big Brother. See Nomination history for details.
 Overnight Voting - In some eviction nights, people will only be given 24 hours to vote for their favorite housemate.
 House Players - An evicted housemate will remain in the house to test the remaining official housemates through tasks set by Big Brother and the audience.
 Wildcard Housemate - An evicted housemate will have a chance to come back on the roster of housemates.
 Power of One - Starting the 13th eviction, the public may only vote once per day per mobile phone number.
 Big Shot for the Big Slot - The final five housemates are given the chance to have a fifth slot in the finale by completing a shooting task.

Housemates

A total of fourteen housemates entered the House on Day 1, thirteen official housemates plus a sub-official housemate acting as a "mole" in a task to become the fourteenth official housemate. That sub-official housemate was chosen by lottery from a pool of 30 reserved housemates. These are the auditionees who were shortlisted for the show, but did not make the official cut.

All thirteen official housemates plus the sub-official "mole" housemate, chosen via random sampling, entered the House on Day 1 (October 29, 2011). A second batch of housemates entered the House on Day 8, although those assigned to the Industrial House were not physically inside until the next day. Eight reserved housemates entered on Days 15, 23 and 25. The ages indicated were the housemates' ages upon their entrance to the House.

A grand total of 37 housemates—the third most number of housemates in the Philippine franchise behind Otso season's 58 housemates and Kumunity Season 10's 46 housemates.

Houseguests
Similar to the franchise's previous seasons, Big Brother invited guests to his house for special purposes.

Notable houseguests for this season were ex-housemates from previous seasons such as Melisa Cantiveros, Jason Francisco, Anthony Semerad and David Semerad. Franzen Fajardo, Baron Geisler, Beauty Gonzalez, Rica Paras returned as house players. Previous winners, Nene Tamayo, Beatriz Saw, and Keanna Reeves, who became Fairy Godmothers.

Chronology of notable events

House Competitions (Kontra Battles)
On Day 30, Big Brother announced the start of House Competitions, where the two Houses will compete for ten weeks for P150,000 at stake every week. The accumulated pot money for each House will be divided among the remaining housemates of each House after ten weeks. Group immunity from nomination was also put at stake with the seventh and eighth challenges.

The Luxury House residents are known as Team High Voltage and the Industrial House denizens are codenamed Team Wayuk.

Weekly tasks
Below is the list of weekly tasks performed by the housemates. Each of the tasks below are "all-or-nothing" tasks; failure would mean no budget for the next week. There are separate weekly tasks for each House.

The first weekly task was done by the first batch of housemates in the Slums.

Teams High Voltage and Team Wayuk were formed on Day 30. Weekly tasks prior to Day 30 were done by the same sets of housemates, with the exception of the very first weekly task. On Day 22, Jaz and Seichang transferred to the Luxury House and joined in doing Team High Voltage's extended 3rd weekly task. On Day 31, Luz and Seichang transferred to the Industrial House and became part of Team Wayuk.

Starting Day 71, the members of Teams High-Voltage and Wayuk who were drafted into the top 14 were made to do their weekly task as one group.

Wayuk

High Voltage

Joint Team (Wayuk & High Voltage)

 Legend:
  Weekly task was performed in the slums
  Weekly task was performed in the industrial house
  Weekly task was performed in the luxury house
  Weekly task was performed in the outside world
  Weekly task was performed in the hacienda

 Notes:
 : Reserve housemate Carlo lost the 4th task on purpose as part of his secret task as a mole.
 : This task was extended to the Luxury House after the fish flew away from the Slums during its first hour, hence, becoming the team's weekly task for two weeks. Big Brother declared the task a failure because Fifi's tailfin touched the floor frequently.
 : Big Brother declared the task a success because the Luxury housemates ignored nine of 14 distractions.
 : The Luxury and Industrial housemates earned PHP71,500 and PHP48,600, respectively, for charity which resulted a success for both their weekly tasks.
 : By the time accumulation was halted at around 9:30pm on Day 30, 20,959 "Likes" were posted. The target of 14,000 "Likes" was already reached at around the afternoon of Day 29.
 : Five of the six contraptions were successful - two from Team High Voltage and three from Team Wayuk.
 : The success was assured after the nominees of the week got 20 out of 20 answers correct in a challenge to match each housemate's picture with the proper Chinese characters in the right sequence.
 : The task was declared a partial success because the housemates were recognized during the trip at some point.
 : The task was declared a failure because only one housemate (Paco) sat on the throne.

Head of Household Competitions
Housemates from each houses will compete against each other, and the winner/s of the competition will be each house's HOH for week. The HOH will be granted immunity in the coming nomination.

 Notes:
 : Paco did not participate in the challenge, but was declared as HoH to protect his status as house player.
 : Since Paco was the only one to sit on a special throne reserved for the Big Winner, he was declared the HoH.
 : The M5 House Players were explicitly told by Big Brother to pick Paco as HoH to protect his status as house player.

Nomination history

Overview
The housemate first mentioned in each nomination gets two points, while the second gets one point. The percentage of votes shown is the percentage of votes to save unless otherwise stated. Each house would field at least the highest two point gatherers to the list of nominees.

During Week 1, all 13 official housemates and one unofficial housemate lived in the slums. On Day 8, Carlo, the unofficial housemate, became an official housemate, and a second batch of 15 official housemates entered the House. On Day 15, six reserved housemates entered the house. Among the six reserved, Reg and Deniesse are two to become official housemates. On Days 23 and 25, two reserved housemates entered. Seth became an official housemate on Day 26, and Ryan on Day 30.

On Day 8, Jaz, Kevin, Kim, Paco, Pamu and Seichang transferred to the Industrial House to be part of the Unli-day group. On Day 21, Diane, Joya and Wendy transferred to the Luxury House, while on Day 22, Jaz and Seichang transferred to the Luxury House and became part of the Unli-night group. The same day, the remaining Unli-night housemates transferred to the Luxury House when the Slums was demolished. On Day 31, Luz and Seichang transferred to the Industrial House to be part of the Unli-Day group. On Day 66, the two groups switched houses, with the Unli-day group residing in the Luxury House and the Unli-night group residing in the Industrial house.

On Day 71, all housemates were instructed to live in the Industrial House, with the top 14 housemates going to the Luxury House at specified periods of time in the following week. On Days 77 and 79, Deniesse and Slater became part of Team Wayuk. On Day 78, the Industrial House was closed. On Day 106, the top 10 housemates merged into one group.

Challenges granting immunity were held before nominations. For the first nomination, secret challenges were held in both houses which granted the winner(s) immunity from being nominated. From the second nomination until the fifth nomination, and from the tenth nomination onwards, Head/s of Household (HOH) competitions were held in both houses, where the winner/s will be granted immunity in the coming nomination. For the seventh and eighth nominations, House Competitions also have group immunity in the coming nomination put at stake.

For this season, former housemates chosen by Big Brother were asked to come back as House Players, as indicated in the nominations table. The Day numbers indicate the day the house players entered the house. Paco, who was evicted on Day 106, did not leave the house and was tasked to be a house player. On Day 141, he was reinstated as an official wildcard housemate. Kigoy and Luz re-entered on Day 121 as part of the M6 twist, with Kigoy being Forcibly re-evicted on Day 124 and Luz re-evicted on Day 127. Seichang, who was evicted on Day 127, did not leave the house until Day 134.

Starting the 13th eviction, the "Power of One" rule was implemented wherein the public may only vote once per day per Sim card. Overnight voting was also done during the 6th, 8th, 14th and 15th nomination rounds, as well as the Big Night. Hour-long voting was done during the final nomination round.

Table 

Legend:
  indicate Unli-Night housemates living in the slums
  indicate Unli-Day/Team Wayuk housemates
  indicate Unli-Night/Team High Voltage housemates
 Black names indicate Top 10 remaining housemates
  Automatic nomination (due to violation(s) committed, failure of task, reserved housemate evictions)
  Granted immunity (due to a successful completion of a "Secret Task", a challenge winner.)
  Head of Household

Notes

: Carlo is the first of the reserved housemates to be given the chance to enter the house. As he was not able to complete the four tasks assigned to him, Big Brother asked the official housemates to decide for Carlo's chance to stay, giving him a status to become an official housemate. He received 12 out of 13 votes to stay and was therefore declared an official housemate. Since the Slums housemates failed their weekly task, six of them will be "evicted" (in reality, moving to the Industrial House). This was determined by Carlo randomly picking six rattan boxes containing the clothes of the 13 other housemates. The clothes Carlo picked belonged to Jaz, Kevin, Kim, Paco, Pamu and Seichang.
:   The Power Strangers were put on the voting gauntlet with the housemates voting using ears of corn hung on their necks. Kulas, the Blue Stranger, received most number of ears, seven out of 14, and therefore, was evicted from the house. Subsequently, RJ and Reg are tasked to conceal their faces until they become an official housemate, otherwise, they get forced eviction. However, Lordwin and Unad are tasked to unmask and take a picture of them. Lordwin successfully took a picture of RJ, which cost RJ's chance of becoming an official housemate.
:  The Slums male housemates (excluding Slater) were asked if they want the 3Gs to stay, in exchange for three of their female housemates being "evicted" (in reality, moving to the Luxury House). Six of the seven eligible Slums male housemates chose the 3Gs to stay in exchange for Diane, Joya and Wendy. Big Brother then told 3Gs that only one of them would be an official housemate because not all of the men in the slums agree to make them an official housemate. With the remaining Slums female housemates deciding on their fate, Deniesse was declared an official housemate. She received most of the votes, two out of four, to stay.
:  Slater declined to continue his task to make Joya believe he was in love with her, making Big Brother fulfill his promise of giving him an automatic nomination if he declines or fails. Kim and Mark's secret relationship is revealed through a mock trial session, thus being given automatic nomination. Paco and Erica were given immunity for successfully doing their part as jurors but Erica later gave up her immunity. Being new housemates, Deniesse and Reg were exempted from nominations. Jaz and Seichang had undergone nominations in the Industrial House before transferring to the Luxury House. Their votes were counted in their former house and they were exempted from nominations in their new house.
:  As new housemates, Seth and Ryan are exempted from the nominations. Luz and Seichang moved to the Industrial House on Day 30. Nominations took place on Day 31, hence they are exempt from nominations. Seichang was also one of the HOH in the Luxury House before his transfer. UnliDay voting was stopped due to Reg's pending exit by forced eviction due to the numerous and grave House rule violations he committed.
:  Mark was automatically nominated after losing to Luz in a challenge held due to their violations to the house rules. Voting for the nominees were stopped due to Lyn's voluntary exit and Mark's forced eviction because of numerous rule violations.
:  Big Brother asked the housemates in the Industrial house if they wanted to give anyone in the house an automatic nomination. Ryan chose to automatically nominate Kevin. Ryan was required to undergo the regular nomination process as well, thereby nominating three people for this round. Big Brother instructed the teams to switch houses.
:  On Day 71, Big Brother announced that all housemates will undergo overnight public voting and that only 14 housemates will remain at the end of the week. The top five vote earners from each group will remain and the remaining four will be determined by other means. Even though the 8th, 12th and 13th top vote earners of the overall vote were not revealed, it could be deduced from the per-house results that Jessica, Steph and Naprey were the 8th, 12th and 13th top vote earners, respectively. It was announced that the Intensity 7 Saturday eviction is the sixth eviction night of the season. Jerico and Steph were officially evicted on Day 74, Ryan on Day 75, Roy on Day 76 and Naprey and Unad on Day 77. The housemates, however, left the house on Day 78.
  Team Wayuk won nomination immunity for winning their House Competition, resulting in all nominees coming from team High- Voltage only.
  As part of Big Brother's punishment to the housemates for failing the eighth House Competition, all of the remaining housemates will nominate one of their teammates face to face as the least deserving housemate. Team High Voltage picked Wendy, while Team Wayuk picked Deniesse. Wendy and Deniesse will do a task assigned by Big Brother. Also, Kevin, Pamu and Tin went on the Big Road Trip but three failed to accomplish their task resulting in an eviction between Deniesse and Wendy decided by overnight voting.
  Tin was automatically nominated after failing a challenge based on the Big Road Trip. Paco reaped the automatic nomination for talking about the nomination process. Both nominations were only made known to the nominees. Despite being evicted as a housemate, Paco stayed in the house and became a House Player.
  Because of not fully succeeding in the Great Marinduque Adventure, Slater agreed to be automatically nominated. As Head of Household, Divine was tasked to replace a nominee and she chose to replace Deniesse with Biggel. As House Player, Paco was tasked to add a housemate to the list of nominees and he chose Eting.
  Big Brother implemented a new nomination scheme wherein a housemate will nominate three other housemates. The housemate first mentioned gets three points, second mentioned gets two points, while the third gets one point. All points towards Paco do not count as he is a house player. Voting for the nominees was stopped due to Deniesse's forced eviction as a result of grave House violations she committed. Because of this, Carlo, who got the fewest votes, was not evicted. Meanwhile, the public were asked to vote on Paco's fate as a House Player. The results denoted that Paco should stay.
  The housemates underwent a mock nomination before the normal nomination process wherein only Kevin, Seichang and Slater changed their votes. Because of this, original nominee Slater was saved, while Divine was added to the list of nominees. Despite being evicted as a housemate, Seichang stayed in the house.
  Big Brother asked the M5 to automatically nominate someone from the remaining housemates and they chose Tin. The housemates underwent a mock face to face nomination before the normal nomination process. Because of this, Carlo was added to the list of nominees.
  Big Brother implemented the "Power of One" rule wherein if a housemate receives even one vote, he will automatically be put on the nomination list. Any votes cast by Paco (Divine and Slater) and for Paco do not count. On Day 139, Paco was given a chance to become a wildcard housemate with the public deciding his fate. The wildcard housemate public poll also used the "Power of One" rule.
  Because the housemates failed the "Big Shot for the Big Slot" challenge, only four slots are open for the finale and one of the final five has to be evicted in a mid-week eviction.
  For the last three open voting rounds, votes are reset after each eviction. Only votes cast after Divine's eviction are counted towards the Big Night total, unlike previous seasons wherein all votes cast during open voting (including between evictions) were counted.

S–E voting system result 
Below is the eviction voting result from the first to fourth eviction round. This voting system was stopped after the fourth eviction round.

 Legend:
  indicate housemates living in the industrial house
  indicate housemates living in the luxury house

Christmas nomination 
On Day 51, the housemates were asked to nominate who they think deserves to get a gift from Big Brother for Christmas. The six recipients, together with the other housemates, must work together to get the gifts. The housemate first mentioned in each nomination gets two points, while the second gets one point.

 Legend:
  indicate Unli-Day/Team Wayuk housemates
  indicate Unli-Night/Team High Voltage housemates

Mock nominations 

For the 12th and 13th Nominations, the housemates underwent mock nominations before the normal nomination process.

 Nominated Housemates
 Head of Household

Notes

: Big Brother asked the housemates to nominate two housemates they feel that are not showing their true selves. Big Brother then told Paco to have a conference towards the same issue. After the conference, Big Brother asked the housemates to again nominate their housemates. Only Kevin, Seichang and Slater changed their votes.
: The remaining housemates (including Paco) underwent a face to face nomination where they will mention two names. Big Brother then told the housemates to have a conference regarding the nominees. After the conference, Big Brother asked the housemates to again nominate their housemates.

Ideal Big Four Lists 

On Day 149, Big Brother ordered the remaining five housemates to make their ideal Big Four list (from first to fourth place) for the upcoming Big Night using a podium in the living room.

Big Night at the Grandstand
On March 31, 2012, 154 days after the season started, at the Quirino Grandstand, Slater Young was declared the Big Winner after amassing 40.02% of the votes which was taking home two million pesos cash and other special prizes. Leaving before him were Second Big Placer Pamu with 21.49% of the votes which receives one million pesos cash, Third Big Placer Biggel with 21.39% of the votes which receives half a million pesos cash and Fourth Big Placer Paco with 17.10% of the votes which receives 300,000 pesos cash. Slater thus earned the distinction of being the first male winner of a regular season four years after Ruben Gonzaga was declared as the first male winner of the entire franchise. The Big Night voting was only done overnight, with the Power of One rule in effect. This is also the first and only season wherein only vote percentages are shown and not the actual number of votes. The theme of the Big Night is Filipino style.

This table shows the summary of votes as obtained by each of the Big 4 in the Big Night.

References

External links
Official Website

Pinoy Big Brother seasons
2011 Philippine television seasons
2012 Philippine television seasons